John David Cairns (7 August 1966 – 9 May 2011) was a Scottish politician who served as Minister of State for Scotland from 2005 to 2008. A member of Scottish Labour Party, he was Member of Parliament (MP) for Inverclyde, formerly Greenock and Inverclyde, from 2001 until his death in 2011.

Early life
Cairns was born and raised in Greenock. He attended Notre Dame High School in the town, before training for the Roman Catholic priesthood at the Pontifical Gregorian University in Rome. He continued his studies at the Franciscan International Centre in Canterbury.

From 1991 to 1994 he served as a priest in Clapham. He left the priesthood in 1994 and became director of the Christian Socialist Movement. In 1997 he became a research assistant to newly elected Labour MP, Siobhain McDonagh until he himself became an MP in 2001. In 1998 he was elected as a councillor in the London Borough of Merton where he served until 2002.

Parliamentary career
Cairns had ambitions to enter House of Commons but was barred due to the Removal of Clergy Disqualification Act 1801 and the Catholic Relief Act 1829 which prevented present or former Roman Catholic priests from being elected to Parliament. To rectify this, Siobhain McDonagh MP introduced the House of Commons Disqualification (Amendment) Bill in Parliament on 16 June 1999, but the Bill failed. The government subsequently introduced the House of Commons (Removal of Clergy Disqualification) Bill, which removed almost all restrictions on clergy of whatever denomination from sitting in the House of Commons. The only exception is Church of England (Anglican) bishops, due to their reserved status as members of the House of Lords. The bill passed on 11 May 2001.

Cairns had already been selected as the Labour candidate in his home town following the retirement of Norman Godman. He was elected as the Labour MP for Greenock and Inverclyde at the 2001 general election with a majority of 9,890, becoming the first person born in Greenock to represent it in Parliament. He made his maiden speech on 4 July 2001.

Cairns was appointed as the Parliamentary Private Secretary to the Minister of State at the Department for Work and Pensions Malcolm Wicks in 2003, and following the 2005 general election, at which, due to the redrawing of boundaries his constituency was abolished and replaced with a larger Inverclyde constituency, he became a member of the Labour government as the Parliamentary Under-Secretary of State for Scotland. He then had the Northern Ireland Office added to his responsibilities and in 2007 he became the Minister of State for Scotland. He played a high profile role in the media as the principal defender of Scotland's role in the United Kingdom in opposition to the movement for Scottish independence. Cairns was Chair of Labour Friends of Israel, and while he gave up the position when becoming a junior minister, he remained a committed member of the group.

On 16 September 2008, Cairns resigned from the government during arguments in the Labour party over Gordon Brown's leadership, saying that the time had come to "allow a leadership debate to run its course". He was the only minister to resign after rebel MPs began calling for a leadership contest. The Guardian later called it "a principled decision by a principled politician". In the 2010 general election, Cairns was returned as Member of Parliament for his constituency of Inverclyde with a majority of 14,416, which was an increase on his previous election.

Personal life and death
Cairns was openly gay, and at the time of his death, was in a relationship with Dermot Kehoe. 

In March 2011, Cairns was hospitalised in London for acute pancreatitis, and died at Royal Free Hospital on 9 May 2011, at the age of 44.

See also
 James Godfrey MacManaway
 Roman Catholic Church in Scotland

Notes

References

External links

 
 Profile: David Cairns, David Thompson, BBC News, 16 September 2008
 David Cairns on Using Social Media in Election 2010

Video clips
 Newsnight 7 July 2007

1966 births
2011 deaths
Pontifical Gregorian University alumni
Councillors in the London Borough of Merton
Deaths from pancreatitis
Gay politicians
Labour Friends of Israel
LGBT members of the Parliament of the United Kingdom
Scottish LGBT politicians
Scottish Labour MPs
Northern Ireland Office junior ministers
People from Greenock
Politics of Inverclyde
UK MPs 2001–2005
UK MPs 2005–2010
UK MPs 2010–2015
Laicized Roman Catholic priests
20th-century Scottish LGBT people
21st-century Scottish LGBT people